John Conrad Nagel (March 16, 1897 – February 24, 1970) was an American film, stage, television and radio actor. He was considered a famous matinée idol and leading man of the 1920s and 1930s. He was given an Academy Honorary Award in 1940 and three stars on the Hollywood Walk of Fame in 1960.

Early life
Born in Keokuk, Iowa, into an upper-middle-class family, he was the son of a musician father, Dr. Frank L. Nagel, who was of German descent, and a mother, Frances (née Murphy), who was a locally praised singer. Nagel's mother died early in his life, and he always attributed his artistic inclination to growing up in a family environment that encouraged self-expression. When Nagel was three, his father, Frank, became dean of the music conservatory at Highland Park College in Des Moines, and the family moved there. 

After graduating from Highland Park College, Nagel left for California to pursue a career in the relatively new medium of motion pictures where he garnered instant attention from the Hollywood studio executives. With his  frame, blue eyes, and wavy blond hair; the young, Midwestern Nagel was seen by studio executives as a potentially wholesome matinee idol whose unpretentious all-American charm would appeal to the nation's nascent film-goers.

Film career

Nagel was immediately cast in film roles that cemented his unspoiled lover image. His first film was the 1918 retelling of Little Women, which quickly captured the public's attention and set Nagel on a path to silent film stardom. His breakout role came in the 1920 film, The Fighting Chance, opposite Swedish starlet Anna Q. Nilsson. In 1918, Nagel was elected to The Lambs, the theatrical club.

In 1927, Nagel starred alongside Lon Chaney Sr., Marceline Day, Henry B. Walthall and Polly Moran in the now lost Tod Browning directed horror film, London After Midnight. Unlike many other silent films stars, Nagel had little difficulty transitioning to sound films. His baritone voice was judged to be perfect for sound, so he appeared in about thirty films in only two years. He described the time as a "great adventure." He was working so steadily that one night when he and his wife planned to go to the movies, he was in films playing at Grauman's, Loew's, and Paramount's theaters. "We couldn't find a theater where I wasn't playing. So we'd go back home. I was an epidemic." He spent the next several decades being very well received in high-profile films as a character actor.  He was also frequently heard on radio and made many notable appearances on television.

The Academy and SAG
On May 11, 1927, Nagel was among 35 other film industry insiders to found the Academy of Motion Picture Arts and Sciences (AMPAS); a professional honorary organization dedicated to the advancement of the arts and sciences of motion pictures. Fellow actors involved in the founding included: Mary Pickford, Douglas Fairbanks, Richard Barthelmess, Jack Holt, Milton Sills, and Harold Lloyd. He served as president of the organization from 1932 to 1933. He was also a founding member of the Screen Actors Guild (SAG). 

Nagel was the host of the 3rd Academy Awards ceremony held on November 5, 1930, the 5th Academy Awards on November 18, 1932, and a co-host with Bob Hope at the 25th Academy Awards ceremony on March 19, 1953. The 21-year gap between his appearances in 1932 and 1953 is a record for an Oscar ceremonies host.

Radio and television
Nagel was the announcer for Alec Templeton Time, a musical variety program on NBC Radio in the summer of 1939. He was the host on Silver Theatre, a summer replacement program that began June 8, 1937.

From 1937 to 1947, he hosted and directed the radio program Silver Theater. He then hosted the TV game show Celebrity Time from 1948 to 1952 and the DuMont Television Network program Broadway to Hollywood from 1953 to 1954.

From September 14, 1955, to June 1, 1956, Nagel hosted Hollywood Preview, a 30-minute show on the DuMont Television Network which featured Hollywood stars with clips of upcoming films.

In 1961, again on television but in an acting role, he made a guest appearance on the popular courtroom drama Perry Mason, portraying the character Nathan Claver, an art collector and murderer, in the episode "The Case of the Torrid Tapestry".

In 1962 he guest-starred on the TV Western Gunsmoke as the vengeful Major Emerson Owen in S7E33's “The Prisoner”.

Personal life
Nagel married and divorced three times. 

Nagel died in 1970 in New York City at the age of 72. A spokesman for the office of the Chief Medical Examiner said that Nagel's death was "due to natural causes", more specifically, a heart attack and emphysema. He added that no autopsy was planned.

Awards and honors
In 1940, Nagel was given an Honorary Academy Award for his work with the Motion Picture Relief Fund. 

For his contributions to film, radio, and television, Nagel was given three stars on the Hollywood Walk of Fame at 1719 Vine Street (motion pictures), 1752 Vine Street (radio), and 1752 Vine Street (television).

Filmography

Silent

Little Women (1918) as Laurie Laurence
The Lion and the Mouse (1919) as Jefferson Ryder
Redhead (1919) as Matthew Thurlow
Romeo's Dad (1919, Short)
The Fighting Chance (1920) as Stephen Siward
Unseen Forces (1920) as Clyde Brunton
Midsummer Madness (1921) as Julian Osborne
Forbidden Fruit (1921) as Actor in play 'Forbidden Fruit' (uncredited)
What Every Woman Knows (1921) as John Shand
The Lost Romance (1921) as Allen Erskine, M.D
Sacred and Profane Love (1921) as Emilie Diaz, a pianist
Fool's Paradise (1921) as Arthur Phelps
Saturday Night (1922) as Richard Prentiss
Hate (1922) as Dick Talbot
The Ordeal (1922) as Dr. Robert Acton
Nice People (1922) as Scotty White
The Impossible Mrs. Bellew (1922) as John Helstan
Singed Wings (1922) as Peter Gordon
Grumpy (1923) as Ernest Heron
Bella Donna (1923) as Nigel Armine
Lawful Larceny (1923) as Andrew Dorsey
The Rendezvous (1923) as Walter Stanford
Name the Man (1924) as Victor Stowell
Three Weeks (1924) as Paul Verdayne
The Rejected Woman (1924) as John Leslie
Tess of the d'Urbervilles (1924) as Angel Clare
Sinners in Silk (1924) as Brock Farley
Married Flirts (1924) as Perley Rex
The Snob (1924) as Herrick Appleton
So This Is Marriage (1924) as Peter Marsh
Excuse Me (1925) as Harry Mallory
Cheaper to Marry (1925) as Dick Tyler
Pretty Ladies (1925) as Maggie's Dream Lover
Sun-Up (1925) as Rufe
Lights of Old Broadway (1925) as Dirk de Rhonde
The Only Thing (1925) as Harry Vane - the Duke of Chevenix
Dance Madness (1926) as Roger Halladay
 Memory Lane (1926) as Jimmy Holt
The Exquisite Sinner (1926) as Dominique Prad
The Waning Sex (1926) as Philip Barry
There You Are! (1926) as George Fenwick
Tin Hats (1926) as Jack Benson
Heaven on Earth (1927) as Edmond Durand
Slightly Used (1927) as Major John Smith
Quality Street (1927) as Dr. Valentine Brown
The Girl from Chicago (1927) as Handsome Joe
London After Midnight (1927) as Arthur Hibbs
If I Were Single (1927) as Ted Howard
Tenderloin (1928) as Chuck White
The Crimson City (1928) as Ralph Blake
Glorious Betsy (1928) as Jérôme Bonaparte
Diamond Handcuffs (1928) as John
The Michigan Kid (1928) as Michigan Kid / Jim Rowen
The Mysterious Lady (1928) as Karl von Raden
The Kiss (1929) as André

Sound

Caught in the Fog (1928) as Bob Vickers
State Street Sadie (1928) as Ralph Blake
The Terror (1928) as Narrator of Spoken Credit Titles (uncredited)
Red Wine (1928) as Charles H. Cook
The Redeeming Sin (1929) as Dr. Raoul de Boise
Kid Gloves (1929) as Kid Gloves
The Idle Rich (1929) as William van Luyn
The Thirteenth Chair (1929) as Richard Crosby
The Hollywood Revue of 1929 (1929) as Himself - Master of Ceremonies
The Sacred Flame (1929) as Col. Maurice Taylor
Dynamite (1929) as Roger Towne
The Ship from Shanghai (1930) as Howard Vazey
Second Wife (1930) as Walter Fairchild
Redemption (1930) as Victor Karenin
The Divorcee (1930) as Paul
One Romantic Night (1930) as Dr. Nicholas Haller
Numbered Men (1930) as 26521
A Lady Surrenders (1930) as Winthrop Beauvel
Du Barry, Woman of Passion (1930) as Cosse de Brissac
Today (1930) as Fred Warner
Free Love (1930) as Stephen Ferrier
The Right of Way (1931) as Charley 'Beauty' Steele
East Lynne (1931) as Robert Carlyle
Bad Sister (1931) as Dr. Dick Lindley
Three Who Loved (1931) as John Hanson
Son of India (1931) as William Darsay
The Reckless Hour (1931) as Edward 'Eddie' Adams
The Pagan Lady (1931) as Ernest Todd
Hell Divers (1931) as Lieutenant D.W. "Duke" Johnson
The Man Called Back (1932) as Dr. David Yorke
Divorce in the Family (1932) as Dr. Shumaker
Kongo (1932) as Kingsland
Fast Life (1932) as Burton
The Constant Woman (1933) as Walt Underwood
Ann Vickers (1933) as Lindsey Atwell
Dangerous Corner (1934) as Robert Chatfield
The Marines Are Coming (1934) as Capt. Edward 'Ned' Benton
One Hour Late (1934) as Stephen Barclay
Death Flies East (1935) as John Robinson Gordon
One New York Night (1935) as Kent
Ball at Savoy (1936) as John Egan, posing as Baron Dupont
The Girl from Mandalay (1936) as John Foster
Wedding Present (1936) as Roger Dodacker
Yellow Cargo (1936) as Alan O'Connor
Navy Spy (1937) as Alan O'Connor
The Gold Racket (1937) as Alan O'Connor
Bank Alarm (1937) as Alan O'Connor
The Mad Empress (1939) as Maximilian
One Million B.C. (1940) as Narrator
I Want a Divorce (1940) as David Holland, Sr.
Forever Yours (1945) as Dr. Randall
The Adventures of Rusty (1945) as Hugh Mitchell
Stage Struck (1948) as Police Lt. Williams
 The Vicious Circle (1948) as Karl Nemesch
All That Heaven Allows (1955) as Harvey
Hidden Fear (1957) as Arthur Miller
A Stranger in My Arms (1959) as Harley Beasley
The Man Who Understood Women (1959) as G.K. Brody

In popular culture 
In the M*A*S*H episode "Abyssinia, Henry" – which featured McLean Stevenson's final appearance on the show – Lt. Col. Blake finds out that his mother-in-law used his brown double-breasted suit to attend a costume party dressed as Conrad Nagel.

Radio appearances

References

External links

 
 
 
 
 Silent Ladies and Gents
 Conrad Nagel on Golden Silents
 Photographs of Conrad Nagel

1897 births
1970 deaths
American people of German descent
Academy Honorary Award recipients
Academy of Motion Picture Arts and Sciences founders
Presidents of the Academy of Motion Picture Arts and Sciences
American male film actors
American male silent film actors
American male radio actors
American male television actors
Male actors from Des Moines, Iowa
People from Keokuk, Iowa
Vaudeville performers
20th-century American male actors
Members of The Lambs Club